Manuel Márquez Sterling (born Carlos Manuel Agustin Márquez Sterling y Loret de Mola on August 28, 1872 in Lima, Peru – December 9, 1934, Washington, DC, United States) was a Cuban diplomat and interim President of Cuba for 6 hours on January 18, 1934. In an article published by Bohemia in December, 1934 (as a result of his death) he is credited with saving the life of Mexican President Francisco I. Madero, when the latter was hiding from the authorities of then Mexican President Porfirio Diaz, during the initial states of the Mexican Revolution.

He served in the Cuban War of Liberation and went to Washington in 1901 as member of the Cuban mission to protest the Platt Amendment. After a journalistic career he served in diplomatic service for many years. He resigned as Ambassador to Mexico in 1932 after differences with Machado. He later became ambassador to the United States under the presidency of Carlos Manuel de Cespedes y Quesada, acted as Cuban representative under Grau's presidency and also acted as Cuban ambassador under Mendieta's presidency.

He was married to his cousin, Mercedes Márquez Sterling y Ziburo. He was the uncle of Carlos Márquez Sterling, a figure in Cuban politics.

He tied for 16-17th in the Paris 1900 chess tournament (Emanuel Lasker won) played during the world exhibition.

References

 Fulgencio Batista: Volume 1, From Revolutionary to Strongman, Argote-Freyre, Frank (Rutgers, New Jersey: Rutgers University Press, 2006)   
 https://web.archive.org/web/20080123115616/http://www.vitral.org/vitral/vitral51/cent.htm
 https://web.archive.org/web/20080619170844/http://www.endgame.nl/wfairs.htm
  (Spanish)

1872 births
1934 deaths
People from Lima
Foreign ministers of Cuba
Cuban diplomats
Presidents of Cuba
Cuban chess players
Ambassadors of Cuba to Mexico
Ambassadors of Cuba to the United States
1930s in Cuba
20th-century Cuban politicians
Cuban people of Dominican Republic descent